The One More HAIM Tour was the third headlining tour by the American pop rock band Haim in support of their third studio album Women in Music Pt. III (2020). The 45-stop tour began on April 24, 2022, in Las Vegas, Nevada at the Cosmopolitan and ended on September 24, 2022, at Firefly Music Festival in Dover, Delaware.

Background
On December 6, 2021, Haim announced a 27-date North American tour via a video on their Twitter of the sisters dancing to "What Dreams Are Made Of" from The Lizzie McGuire Movie (2003) followed by an announcement of a tour with dates and venues listed at the end. Several stops on their European leg were delayed dates from a planned 2021 tour, which was postponed due to COVID-19-restrictions at the time. Two stops on the tour featured the band opening for the Red Hot Chili Peppers on their 2022 Global Stadium Tour.

Setlist
This set list is representative of the performance on May 31, 2022. It is not representative of all concerts for the duration of the tour.
{{Div col|content=
"Now I'm in It"
"I Know Alone"
"Up from a Dream"
"My Song 5"
"Want You Back"
"3AM"
"I've Been Down"
"Gasoline"
"Leaning on You"
"Hallelujah"
"Man from the Magazine"
"FUBT"
"Los Angeles"
"Don't Wanna"
"Forever"
"Summer Girl"
Encore
"The Wire"
"The Steps"|colwidth=35em}}

Tour dates

Cancelled shows

Notes

References 

2022 concert tours
Concert tours postponed due to the COVID-19 pandemic